Me&John is a record production, engineering, mixing, and songwriting duo based in Toronto, Ontario, Canada. The duo is composed of Ryan Kondrat and John La Magna. The two have created music from a myriad of genres, ranging from dance, hip-hop, folk, and pop.

The two met at school in 2002. They began their career in the dance music scene as ghost writers for Jelo, Donald Glaude, and DJ Dan. They soon merged into the television and advertising side of the music industry working for Syndicate Sound in Toronto. At Syndicate Sound they were able to write music in a fully equipped professional studio, leveraging writing skills for studio time, they Produced and co-wrote Broken Social Scene presents Brendan Canning while simultaneously composing scores for Television and Film. Their next record With Shad, landed them a Polaris Prize shortlisting and a Juno for Hip Hop recording of the year. The two are currently Music Directors/Composers for Grayson Matthews in Toronto .

Me&John have recently produced an Album for Lily Frost, Scored and Produced the soundtrack for Paul Schrider's, The Canyons, with Brendan Canning, and just finished a New Documentary for Sony and Gran Turismo, KAZ: Pushing the Virtual Divide, that took home a gold, at London International in 2015.

Album / Contributions

Feature Length Contributions

Television Contributions

References

External links 
 
 

Canadian composers
Canadian male composers
Canadian film score composers
Canadian record producers
Male film score composers